The Benidorm Fest 2022 was the first edition of the annual Benidorm Fest, a television song contest held in the homonymous city, organised and broadcast by RTVE. Presented by Alaska, Inés Hernand and Màxim Huerta, the competition was held between 26 and 29 January 2022.

"SloMo", written by Leroy Sanchez, Keith Harris, Ibere Fortes, Maggie Szabo and Arjen Thonen, and performed by Chanel, won the inaugural edition of the Benidorm Fest, and thus  at the Eurovision Song Contest 2022 in Turin, Italy, where it placed third, marking the best performance for Spain in Eurovision since .

The first edition of Benidorm Fest was met with a positive reception for its realization and production, bet on independent artists, and for rejuvenating Eurovision national selections in the country. Almost three million viewers watched the final, making up a 21% share of the television market. Five out of fourteen entries entered the PROMUSICAE chart, two of them reaching the top spot. The debut of Benidorm Fest helped launch the musical careers of Chanel, Rigoberta Bandini, and Tanxugueiras.

Format 
The competition consisted of two semi-finals and one final. In total, 14 candidate songs compete divided between the two semifinals, that is, seven participate in each one. In each semifinal, the four songs with the most votes among the national (30%) and international (20%) professional juries, the demographic panel (25%) and the televote (25%), went directly to the final. During the final, the eight classified songs were performed again to determine which would represent Spain in the Eurovision Song Contest 2022, following the same voting system as in the previous galas.

Presenters

Expert jury members

Guest performers 
Alongside the song competition, the live shows included performances by national and international guest artists.

In the first semi-final, Salvador Sobral, winner of the Eurovision Song Contest 2017, performed "" and Marlon performed "" as interval acts. During the interval of the second semi-final, Ruth Lorenzo, who represented Spain in the Eurovision Song Contest 2014, performed Sergio Dalma's "" (the  entry at the Eurovision Song Contest 1991) and Niña Polaca performed "Nora".

The final was opened by Pastora Soler, who represented Spain in the Eurovision Song Contest 2012, performing her entry "". The interval of the final featured Nia and  performing "", and Soler reappearing to perform "". In addition,  and  Spanish Eurovision entrant Blas Cantó made an appearance to hand the trophy to the winner.

Competing entries 
On 29 September 2021, RTVE opened a one-month period (later extended until 10 November) for artists, authors and composers to send their proposals to the public radio and television corporation, while the broadcaster itself reserved a direct invitation to renowned singers and authors from the current music scene. Both the evaluation of submissions and the invitations were carried out in collaboration with musical advisers J Cruz, Tony Sánchez-Ohlsson and Zahara. At a press conference held on 22 November 2021 Spanish head of delegation Eva Mora declared 692 submissions had been received by the online form, and 194 songs had been submitted by artists directly invited by RTVE, for a total of 886.

The names of the initial 14 artists and songs were announced on 10 December 2021. All the songs were made available on RTVE Play and RTVE's website on 21 December 2021. On 23 January 2022, Luna Ki announced their withdrawal from Benidorm Fest due to a combination of personal issues and the inability to use autotune under Eurovision rules.

Semi-finals 
The two semi-finals were held on 26 and 27 January 2022. The running order of the semi-finals, which was decided by the organizers, was revealed on 13 January 2022.

Semi-final 1
The first semi-final was held on 26 January 2022. Chanel, Tanxugueiras, Blanca Paloma and Varry Brava qualified for the final.

Semi-final 2
The second semi-final was held on 27 January 2022. Rigoberta Bandini, Rayden, Xeinn and Gonzalo Hermida qualified for the final.

Final 
The final was held on 29 January 2022. The running order of the final was decided by a draw held on 28 January 2022.

Ratings

Controversy 
Following Benidorm Fest, allegations of favouritism, also known as "tongo", arose regarding Chanel's victory. One of the members of the national jury, Miryam Benedited, had previously worked with Chanel as a choreographer, leading to allegations of cronyism, as Chanel received the maximum amount of points from the jury. Furthermore, Spanish viewers expressed frustration with the voting format, when it was revealed that Tanxugueiras, who finished in third place, had won the public vote with 70.75%, while winner Chanel only received 3.97%. Public votes were only worth 25% of the total score, while the professional jury votes were worth 50%. RTVE released a statement acknowledging the viewers' dissatisfaction with the selection, and promised to open a dialogue to improve future editions of Benidorm Fest, but maintained that they would support Chanel as the Spanish representative. Both Rigoberta Bandini and Tanxugueiras, who came in second and third place, expressed their support to Chanel, and called for fans to accept the results.

Notes

References 

2022 song contests
2022 in Spanish television
January 2022 events in Spain
Benidorm Fest
Eurovision Song Contest 2022
2022 controversies